Typhoon Malakas (ma-la-KAS, [mɐlɐˈkas]; Filipino word meaning "strong"), known in the Philippines as Typhoon Gener, was a powerful tropical cyclone which affected Taiwan and Japan in mid September 2016. It was the sixteenth named storm and the sixth typhoon of the annual typhoon season in 2016.

Meteorological history

Due to decent organization and improved banding, JTWC upgraded 18W to a tropical storm. 18W was fully upgraded to a named tropical storm by the JMA few hours later and was named Malakas. By September 13, Malakas had improved in its organization and was already strengthening with deep convection wrapping into its LLCC; the JMA upgraded Malakas to a severe tropical storm thereafter. In the same time, Malakas had entered the Philippine area of Responsibility, with PAGASA assigning the local name Gener. Later, it was reported that Malakas was located in marginal conditions for further development due to wind shear caused by the proximity of the outflow of Typhoon Meranti. However the JMA upgraded Malakas to a typhoon three hours later. With improving conditions, it was reported that a cold dense overcast was forming and the JTWC upgraded Malakas to a Category 1 typhoon during the next day.

After maintaining this intensity for six hours, satellite imagery depicted an improved deep convection and a well-defined  eye feature, as Malakas rapidly intensified into a Category 4 typhoon. Shortly thereafter, its eye became cloud-filled and ragged and weakened to a Category 3 typhoon. However, by September 18, Malakas started to re-intensify as it moved east-northeastward. Malakas reached its secondary peak intensity on September 19, but only as a Category 3 typhoon. Malakas then started to weaken due to land interaction with Japan. On September 20, the JTWC downgraded Malakas to a tropical storm, while the JMA downgraded it to a severe tropical storm, because at around 00:00 JST on September 20 (15:00 UTC on September 19), Malakas made landfall over the Ōsumi Peninsula in Japan. It subsequently crossed Cape Muroto at around 11:00 JST (02:00 UTC) and made landfall over Tanabe at around 13:30 JST (04:30 UTC). Both agencies issued their final advisory later that day as it became extratropical.

Impact

Taiwan
Meanwhile, Taitung City was affected by Foehn wind. Overall, damages from Malakas to Taiwan was minimal.

Japan
Malakas passed over the Yaeyama Islands on September 17, producing heavy rain and hurricane-force winds, especially in Taketomi. Malakas also caused widespread damage to the Japanese archipelago, Yamakawa Station to Makurazaki Station of the Ibusuki Makurazaki Line have to be closed due to falling trees. Heavy rains caused flooding to these areas. Malakas also brought heavy rains to Kansai region. Agricultural damage were about JP¥26.18 billion (US$257 million). Overall damage nationwide were at US$300 million.

See also

Typhoon Jelawat (2012)
Typhoon Neoguri (2014)
Typhoon Vongfong (2014)

References

External links

JMA General Information of Typhoon Malakas (1616) from Digital Typhoon
JMA Best Track Data of Typhoon Malakas (1616) 
19W.MALAKAS from the U.S. Naval Research Laboratory

2016 in Japan
2016 in Taiwan
2016 Pacific typhoon season
September 2016 events in Asia
Typhoons in Japan
Typhoons in Taiwan
Malakas